Yu Jinglian (Chinese: 于景连; 5 March 1953 – ) was a coach and former Chinese footballer. He played for China PR in the 1976 Asian Cup.

Playing career
Yu Jinglian was born in Weihai. He started his career playing for the Liaoning football team in 1970. In 1976, Yu was called up to the Chinese national team and played in the 1976 Asian Cup. He joined air force football team in 1978 and moved to Beijing football team in 1980. Yu retired from football in 1984.

Coaching career
Yu Jinglin joined Shaanxi Guoli to work as an assistant coach in 2000. On 24 December 2000, he left Shaanxi Guoli and joined Chengdu Wuniu as assistant coach. Yu Jinglian left Chengdu Wuniu in 2001 but returned and worked as assistant coach the second time on 6 August until 2003.  
In 2004, Yu joined Chongqing Lifan to work as assistant coach. From 2008 to 2009, Yu Jinglian went to Wenzhou Tomorrow to work as assistant coach and coach.

Honours 
Beijing
 China national league: 1982, 1984

References

1953 births
Living people
Chinese footballers
1976 AFC Asian Cup players
Footballers from Shandong
Association football forwards
Beijing Guoan F.C. players